Isobelle Ann Dods-Withers (née Dods; 5 February 1876 – 13 June 1939) was a Scottish oil and pastel artist who was known for her paintings of towns and villages in southern Europe.

Biography
Dods-Withers was born at Congalton Mains at North Berwick in Scotland. Her father was a John William Dods and when she married Alfred Withers she took Dods-Withers as her surname. After studying at the Edinburgh College of Art Dods-Withers had a prolific exhibition career both in Britain and overseas. In Britain she was a frequent exhibitor at the Royal Academy, with the Royal Institute of Oil Painters, the International Society of Sculptors, Painters and Gravers, The Pastel Society and the Women's International Art Club. Overseas Dods-Withers work was shown at the Paris Salon, in Munich, Barcelonia and San Francisco.

References

External links
 

1876 births
1939 deaths
20th-century Scottish women artists
Alumni of the Edinburgh College of Art
People from North Berwick
Scottish women painters
Pastel artists